Maistre may refer to:

 Compte de Maistre, see Joseph-Marie, Comte de Maistre
 Baron Almaury de Maistre, see Baronne Almaury de Maistre
 John A. Gauci-Maistre K.M. (born 1947), Maltese businessman
 Maistre (surname)
 De Maistre (surname)
 Le Maistre (surname)

See also

 Maistre Jhan (1485-1538) French composer
 Maistre Wace (1110-1174) French poet
 
 
 Maitre
 Meister
 Master (disambiguation)
 Maestro (disambiguation)
 Magister (disambiguation)